Gononoorda is a genus of moths of the family Crambidae.

Species
Gononoorda jacobsoni Munroe, 1977
Gononoorda neervoorti Munroe, 1977

References

Odontiinae
Crambidae genera
Taxa named by Eugene G. Munroe